Sivaranjiniyum Innum Sila Pengalum is a 2021 Indian Tamil-language anthology film directed by Vasanth S Sai.

The film notably has no score, instead featuring sounds designed by Anand Krishnamoorthi. The production of the film started in early 2015, had the premiere in 2018 at several film festivals and finally released through OTT platform SonyLIV, skipping theatrical release.

This film won three National Film Awards: Best Feature Film in Tamil, Best Supporting Actress and Best Editing.

Summary
The film contains three female-centric short stories written by the writers Ashoka Mithran (Vimosanam), Adhavan (Ottam) and Jeyamohan (Devakich chiththiyin diary). starring Lakshmi Priyaa Chandramouli, Parvathy Thiruvothu, and Kalieswari Sreenivasan in the lead roles.

Cast
 
 Lakshmi Priyaa Chandramouli as Sivaranjini 
 Parvathy Thiruvothu as Devaki
 Kalieswari Srinivasan as Saraswati
 Karunakaran as Chandran
 Sunder Ramu as Mani
 Karthick Krishna as Hari
 G. Marimuthu
 Senthi Kumari
 Hamaresh
  Nethra
 Rama
 Eswari
 Raja Rani Pandian
 Lizzie Antony
 Vazhakku Enn Muthuraman
 Raichal Rabecca
 Rajmohan
 Cheenu Mohan
 Sairam Vishwa
 Vaali Mohan Das 
 Vijaya Paatti

Production
Production work for the film began during January 2015, with Vasanth beginning a schedule for a new film starring Parvathy Thiruvothu were approached to be a part of the cast, as was actor Karunakaran Vasanth noted that the film would be women-centric and would be made as a tribute to his late mentor, K. Balachander, who often depicted strong woman characters in his films. The film was revealed to have three female-centric short stories written by writers Jeyamohan, Adhavan and Ashokamitran.

Vasanth shot scenes featuring Pooja Kumar during September 2015, but later changed the script and dropped the actress from the project. The lead actress of the film Dheepan (2015), Kalieaswari Srinivasan, was also recruited to portray a role in the film during late 2015. In August 2016, Vasanth revealed that the film was "seventy percent" complete. In November 2017, Parvathy revealed that she had completed work on the film and that she would portray a working woman in the early 1990s. She added that the film was shot on a small budget and the creative work was done in a single room rather than having a big film set. Salsan Jose is the Dolby Atmos mix engineer.

Release 
Sivaranjiniyum Innum Sila Pengalum skipped theatrical release, but opted for a digital one on 26 November 2021 on SonyLIV.

Reception 
The Hindu has written a review praising Director Vasanth has made a "powerful anthology delves deep into the minds of women across three time periods". Times of India rated the movie 4.0/5 appreciating the film as "A Superbly made, Immensely affecting Anthology".

References

External links
 

2018 films
Films directed by Vasanth
Films based on short fiction
Indian anthology films
Indian feminist films
Films scored by Ilaiyaraaja